The Palmer House – A Hilton Hotel is a historic hotel in Chicago's Loop area. It is a member of the Historic Hotels of America program of the National Trust for Historic Preservation. The Palmer House was the city's first hotel with elevators, and the first hotel with electric light bulbs and telephones in the guest rooms. Although the hotel has been dubbed the longest continuously operating hotel in North America, it closed in March 2020 due to the COVID-19 pandemic and reopened on June 17, 2021.

History

First Palmer House

The first was built as a wedding present from Potter Palmer to his bride Bertha Honoré. Located at State and Quincy, it opened on September 26, 1870. It burned one year later on October 9, 1871, during the Great Chicago Fire. Palmer had already begun construction of a new hotel at State and Monroe prior to the Great Chicago Fire.

Second Palmer House

Designed by architect John M. Van Osdel, the second Palmer House Hotel was seven stories.  Its amenities included oversized rooms, luxurious decor, and sumptuous meals served in grand style. The floor of its barber shop was tiled and silver dollars were embedded in a diamond pattern. Constructed mainly of iron and brick, the hotel was widely advertised as, "The World's Only Fire Proof Hotel." Famous visitors included presidential hopefuls James Garfield, Grover Cleveland, Ulysses S. Grant, William Jennings Bryan, and William McKinley; writers Mark Twain,  L. Frank Baum, and Oscar Wilde; actresses Sarah Bernhardt and Eleonora Duse, and French cabaret singer Yvette Guilbert in 1897.  It was completed in 1875.  An 1895 meeting at the hotel of faculty representatives from various Midwestern universities resulted in the founding of the Big Ten Conference.

Third Palmer House
By the 1920s, the business in downtown Chicago could support a much larger facility, and the Palmer Estate decided to erect a new 25-story hotel.  It hired Holabird & Roche to design the building, and their team included architect Richard Neutra in a junior role.  Between 1923 and 1925, the hotel was rebuilt on the same site.

In December 1945, Conrad Hilton bought the Palmer House for $20 million and it was thereafter known as The Palmer House Hilton. In 2005, Hilton sold the property to Thor Equities, but retained management through the Hilton chain.

The architecture firms of Loebl Schlossman & Hackl and David Fleener Architects completely renovated and restored the hotel between 2007 and 2009. The total cost was over $170 million. The hotel has a total of 1,639 guest rooms, making it the second-largest hotel in the city after the Hyatt Regency Chicago. It has recently had its name adjusted to Palmer House - A Hilton Hotel.

In 1970, the hotel was the site of the murder of Evelyn Okubo, a young Japanese-American racial justice activist attending a Japanese American Citizens League convention held there.

Entertainers who have appeared at the Palmer House's Empire Room have included Frank Sinatra, Judy Garland, Liberace, Ella Fitzgerald, Maurice Chevalier, Lena Horne, Nat King Cole, Louis Armstrong, Harry Belafonte, Sammy Davis Jr., Peggy Lee, Carol Channing,  Bobby Darin, Jimmy Durante, Sonny & Cher, Liza Minnelli, Dionne Warwick, Sophie Tucker, Tommy Dorsey, Phyllis Diller, Lou Rawls, Shep Fields (1930s)   Dick Gregory (1963), Frankie Laine (1963), Josh White (1966), Tony Bennett (1968), Florence Henderson (1968), Donald O'Connor (1971), Jerry Lewis (1971),  The Supremes (1971 & 1972),Jane Powell (1972), Lorna Luft (1972), Trini Lopez (1973), The Lettermen (1973) and many others.

In August 2020 Wells Fargo filed suit against hotel owner Thor Equities for defaulting on a $333 million commercial mortgage. Due to the COVID-19 pandemic, the hotel closed in March 2020.

The hotel reopened to the public on June 17, 2021 following a series of upgrades to its interior, including a renovation to its indoor pool.

Gallery

See also
Chocolate brownie - invented at the hotel for the World's Columbian Exposition in 1893.

References

Further reading

External links

Palmer House - official website

Palmer House - A Hilton Hotel - official Hilton website with virtual tour
Palmer House Chicagology Palmer House history by Chicagology
Chicago Historical Society - 1873 description by Rudyard Kipling following the Great Chicago Fire
 Fred A. Bernstein, "A Hotel Looks Back to Its 1920s Glamour", The New York Times, October 25, 2008
 Palmer House Hilton Reviews - Reviews of guests who have visited the hotel

1920s architecture in the United States
Chicago school architecture in Illinois
Hilton Hotels & Resorts hotels
Hotels established in 1871
Projects by Holabird & Root
Skyscraper hotels in Chicago
Chicago Landmarks
Historic Hotels of America